Frederick William James (9 May 1884 – 15 October 1948) was an Australian rules footballer who played with Geelong in the Victorian Football League (VFL).

Notes

External links 

1884 births
1948 deaths
Australian rules footballers from Victoria (Australia)
Geelong Football Club players